The 61st Filipino Academy of Movie Arts and Sciences Awards Night was held at the AFP Theater in Camp Aguinaldo, Quezon City on April 21, 2013.

El Presidente (English: The President; Filipino: Ang Pangulo), a 2012 biopic film based on the life of Gen. Emilio Aguinaldo, the first president of the Philippine Republic is this edition's recipient of the Best Picture Award while its lead star, Jeorge Estregan, got the award for Best Actor. Angel Locsin, the female lead for the film One More Try, won as this year's Best Actress.

Nominees and winners

Major awards
Winners are listed first and highlighted with boldface.

Special Awards

German Moreno Youth Achievement Award
Janella Salvador
Xian Lim
Ruru Madrid
Joyce Ching
Recognition Award
German Moreno (For 50th Year in Philippine Cinema)
Arturo M. Padua Memorial Award
Cristy Fermin
Fernando Poe, Jr. Memorial Award
Jeorge Estregan
Presidential Award for Cinematic Arts Excellence
Nora Aunor
FAMAS Grand Award
Francis Tolentino, MMDA Chairman
Public Service Award
Victor B. Endriga, PhD
Amado Domingo Valdez
Celebrity Skin of the Night
Maxene Magalona
Great Shape Award
Benjamin Alves

References

External links
FAMAS Awards

FAMAS Award
FAM
FAM